This is a list of buildings that are examples of the Art Deco architectural style in Michigan, United States.

Ann Arbor 
 Burton Memorial Tower, University Of Michigan Central Campus Historic District, Ann Arbor, 1936
 First National Bank Building, Ann Arbor, 1927
 Nickels Arcade, Ann Arbor, 1915
 State Theatre, Ann Arbor, 1942

Battle Creek 
 Battle Creek Tower, Battle Creek, 1931
 Boy's Club Building, Battle Creek, 1928
 Heritage Tower, Battle Creek, 1931

Detroit 
 Argonaut Building (now A. Alfred Taubman Center for Design Education), Detroit, 1928
 Albert Kahn Building, Detroit, 1931
 Alger Theater, Detroit, 1935
 Ambassador Bridge, Detroit to Windsor, Ontario, Canada, 1929
 AT&T Michigan Headquarters, Detroit, 1928
 Boyce Apartments, Palmer Park Square Apartment Building Historic District, Detroit, 1925 and 1964
 Buhl Building, Detroit, 1925
 Cass Motor Sales, Detroit, 1928
 Crystal Ballroom, Detroit, 1919 and 1936
 David Stott Building, Detroit, 1929
 Denby High School, Detroit, 1930
 Detroit Free Press Building, Detroit, 1925
 Detroit Naval Armory, Detroit, 1930
 Detroit News Complex, Detroit, 1915
 El Tovar Apartments, Detroit, 1928
 Elwood Bar, Detroit, 1936
 Fisher Building, Detroit, 1928
 Fox Theatre, Detroit, 1928
 The Frontera Building, Detroit, 1932
 Guardian Building, Detroit, 1929
 Industrial Building, Detroit, 1928
 The Kean, Detroit, 1931
 Laredo Apartments, Detroit, 1920s
 Lee Plaza, Detroit, 1929
 Maccabees Building, Detroit, 1927
 Majestic Theater, Detroit, 1915 and 1934
 Metropolitan Center for High Technology, Detroit, 1927
 Michigan Bell and Western Electric Warehouse, Detroit, 1929
 Mumford High School, Detroit, 1949
 Music Hall Center for the Performing Arts, Detroit, 1928
 Penobscot Building, Detroit, 1928
 Pershing High School, Detroit, 1929
 Saint Paul Manor Apartments, Detroit, 1925
 Stanley's Mania Café, Detroit, 1940
 Stratford Theatre, Detroit, 1916 and 1930s
 Theodore Levin United States Courthouse, Detroit, 1934
 Town Apartments, Detroit, 1929
 Vanity Ballroom Building, Detroit, 1929
 Whitmore Plaza, Palmer Park Square Apartment Building Historic District, Detroit, 1925 and 1964
 William Livingstone Memorial Lighthouse, Belle Isle Park., Detroit, 1929
 WWJ (AM) Transmitter Building, Detroit, 1936

Flint 
 Charles Stewart Mott Foundation Building, Flint, 1928
 The Paterson Building, Flint, 1931

Kalamazoo 
 Kalamazoo Federal Building and U.S. Courthouse, Kalamazoo, 1939

Lake Huron 
 DeTour Reef Light, Lake Huron, 1931
 Martin Reef Light Station, Lake Huron, 1927
 Round Island Passage Light, Lake Huron, 1948

Lansing 
 Boji Tower, Lansing, 1931
 Charles E. Chamberlain Federal Building & Post Office, Lansing, 1932
 J. W. Sexton High School, Lansing, 1943
 J. W. Knapp Company Building, Lansing, 1929
 Ottawa Street Power Station, Lansing, 1939
 Strand Theatre and Arcade, Lansing, 1920

Saginaw 
 Michigan Bell Building, Saginaw, 1930

Traverse City 
 Bijou by the Bay, Traverse City, 1930s
 State Theatre, Traverse City, 1923

Other cities 
 Alpena County Courthouse, Alpena, 1934
 B and C Grocery Building, Royal Oak, 1939
 Bad Axe Theatre, Bad Axe, 1916
 Bay County Building, Bay City, 1933
 Berkley Screw Machine Products Factory (now U-Haul & Storage), Rochester, 1946
 Cass Theatre, Cass City, 1940
 Central Fire Station, Muskegon, 1930
 Cranbrook Schools, Bloomfield Hills, 1929
 Crystal Theatre, Crystal Falls, 1927
 Detroit & Northern Michigan Savings & Loan Association, Quincy Street Historic District, Hancock, 1939
 Ford Valve Plant, Northville, 1936
 Gladwin County Building, Gladwin, 1939
 Gravelly Shoal Light, Saginaw Bay, 1939
 Grays Reef Light, Lake Michigan, 1936
 Home Repair Services, Grand Rapids, 
 Howard Miller Clock Company, Zeeland, 1940s
 Ionia Theatre, Ionia, 1875 and 1930s
 Jenison Fieldhouse, Michigan State University, East Lansing, 1940
 John H. Schaefer Building, Dearborn, 1930
 Keweenaw Waterway Upper Entrance, Lake Superior, 1937
 Landmark Inn, Marquette, 1930
 Mackinac County Courthouse, St. Ignace, 1936
 Macomb County Building, Mount Clemens, 1933
 McKenny Hall, Eastern Michigan University Historic District, Ypsilanti, 1931
 McKinley Elementary School, Wyandotte, 1938
 Michigan Theatre, Jackson, 1929
 Minneapolis Shoal Light Station, Green Bay, Lake Michigan, 1934
 Munising Fire Department and Department of Public Works, Munising, 1939
 Muskegon YMCA Building, Muskegon, 1926
 National Shrine of the Little Flower Basilica, Royal Oak, 1931 and 1936
 National Time & Signal Corporation, Oak Park, 1945
 Northern Michigan Bank and Trust, Iron Mountain, 1927
 Olin Memorial Health Center, East Lansing
 Old Regent Theatre, Allegan, 1919 and 1930s
 Oldsmobile Dealership (now offices), Grand Rapids
 Park Theatre, 108 East Clinton Street, Augusta, 1950
 Park Theatre (now Lincoln Park Lofts), Lincoln Park, 1925
 The People's State Bank (now Fifth Third Bank), Holland, 1928
 Roseville Theatre, 28325 Utica Road, Roseville, 1928
 Seaway Painting, 31801 Schoolcraft St, Livonia, 1940s
 St. Mary's Academy, St. Mary's Academy Historic District, Monroe, 1931
 St. Paul Apostolic Temple Church, 17400 Manderson Road, Highland Park, 1951
 State Bank of Perry, Perry, 1913
 Temple Israel, West Bloomfield Township, 1949
 Trolley Depot Building, Monroe, 1931
 Tuscola County Courthouse, Caro, 1933
 Twin Lakes Java Coffee Roaster (former Fanny's Tavern), Toivola
 Victoria Theater (now Garden Theater), Frankfort, 1923
 WJR Radio Transmitter Building, Riverview, 1934
 The Westown Theater, 611 Midland Street, Midland Street Commercial District, Bay City, 1915

See also 
 List of Art Deco architecture
 List of Art Deco architecture in the United States

References 

 "Art Deco & Streamline Moderne Buildings." Roadside Architecture.com. Retrieved 2019-01-03.
 Cinema Treasures. Retrieved 2022-09-06
 "Court House Lover". Flickr. Retrieved 2022-09-06
 "New Deal Map". The Living New Deal. Retrieved 2020-12-25.
 "SAH Archipedia". Society of Architectural Historians. Retrieved 2021-11-21.

External links
 

 
Art Deco
Art Deco architecture in Michigan
Michigan-related lists